The Pennsylvania State Game Lands Number 259 are Pennsylvania State Game Lands in Armstrong County in Pennsylvania in the United States providing hunting, bird watching, and other activities.

Geography
SGL 259 consists of a single parcel located in Sugarcreek and West Franklin Townships. It lies in the watershed of the Allegheny River, part of the Ohio River watershed. Nearby communities include the Borough of Worthington and populated places Adams, Browns Crossroads, Buffalo Mills, Cowansville, Craigsville, Fosters Mills, Frogtown, Greenville, Laird Crossing, Nichola, Rattigan, Shadyside Village, Sherrett, and Somerville. U.S. Route 422 runs northwest/southeast to the south, Pennsylvania Route 268 runs north/south to the east of SGL 259.

Statistics

Biology
Although Black bear (Ursus americanus) inhabit this area it is not often pursued. Other hunting and furtaking species include Coyote (Canis latrans), deer (Odocoileus virginianus), Gray fox (Urocyon cinereoargenteus), Red fox (Vulpes vulpes), grouse (Bonasa umbellus), mink (Neovison vison), Raccoon (Procyoon lotor), squirrel (Sciurus carolinensis), and turkey (Meleagris gallopavo).

See also
 Pennsylvania State Game Lands
 Pennsylvania State Game Lands Number 105, also located in Armstrong County
 Pennsylvania State Game Lands Number 137, also located in Armstrong County
 Pennsylvania State Game Lands Number 247, also located in Armstrong County
 Pennsylvania State Game Lands Number 287, also located in Armstrong County

References

259
Protected areas of Armstrong County, Pennsylvania